Karataş is a town and district of Adana Province, on the Mediterranean coast of Turkey.

Karataş may also refer to:

Surname
 Alican Karataş (born 1991), Turkish curler
 Dursun Karataş (1952–2008), Turkish communist
 Eda Karataş (born 1995), Turkish women's footballer
 Öztürk Karataş (born 1991), Turkish footballer
 Tuğba Karataş (born 1992), Turkish women's footballer

Places
 Adalı, Karataş, a village in Karataş district of Adana Province, Turkey
 Ataköy, Karataş, a village in Karataş district of Adana Province, Turkey
 Bahçe, Karataş, a village in Karataş district of Adana Province, Turkey
 Bebeli, Karataş, a village in Karataş district of Adana Province, Turkey
 Beyköyü, Karataş, a village in Karataş district of Adana Province, Turkey
 Cırık, Karataş, a village in Karataş district of Adana Province, Turkey
 Çakırören, Karataş, a village in Karataş district of Adana Province, Turkey
 Çakşırlı, Karataş, a village in Karataş district of Adana Province, Turkey
 Çavuşlu, Karataş, a village in Karataş district of Adana Province, Turkey
 Çimeli, Karataş, a village in Karataş district of Adana Province, Turkey
 Çukurkamış, Karataş, a village in Karataş district of Adana Province, Turkey
 Damlapınar, Karataş, a village in Karataş district of Adana Province, Turkey
 Develiören, Karataş, a village in Karataş district of Adana Province, Turkey
 Dolaplı, Karataş, a village in Karataş district of Adana Province, Turkey
 Eğriağaç, Karataş, a village in Karataş district of Adana Province, Turkey
 Gökçeli, Karataş, a village in Karataş district of Adana Province, Turkey
 Gölkaya, Karataş, a village in Karataş district of Adana Province, Turkey
 Gümüşyazı, Karataş, a village in Karataş district of Adana Province, Turkey
 Hacıhasan, Karataş, a village in Karataş district of Adana Province, Turkey
 Hasırağacı, Karataş, a village in Karataş district of Adana Province, Turkey
 Helvacı, Karataş, a village in Karataş district of Adana Province, Turkey
 İnnaplıhüyüğü, Karataş, a village in Karataş district of Adana Province, Turkey
 İsahacılı, Karataş, a village in Karataş district of Adana Province, Turkey
 Kamışlı, Karataş, a village in Karataş district of Adana Province, Turkey
 Kapı, Karataş, a village in Karataş district of Adana Province, Turkey
 Karagöçer, Karataş, a village in Karataş district of Adana Province, Turkey
 Kırhasan, Karataş, a village in Karataş district of Adana Province, Turkey
 Karataş, Bayramören
 Karataş, Çayırlı
 Karataş, Çermik
 Karataş, Çubuk, a village in Çubuk district of Ankara Province, Turkey
 Karataş, Dinar, a village in Dinar district of Afyonkarahisar Province, Turkey
 Karataş, Döşemealtı, a village in Döşemealtı district of Antalya Province, Turkey
 Karataş, Elâzığ
 Karataş, Korkuteli, a village in Korkuteli district of Antalya Province, Turkey
 Karataş, Serik, a village in Serik district of Antalya Province, Turkey
 Karataş, Izmir, neighborhood of İzmir, Turkey
 Karataş, Karataş, a village in Karataş district of Adana Province, Turkey
 Karataş, Mudurnu
 Karataş, Oltu
 Karataş, Palu
 Karataş, Pazaryolu
 Karataş Islets,  two islets of Turkey in the Mediterranean Sea
 Karataş Şahinbey Sport Hall, an indoor multi-purpose sport venue in Gaziantep, Turkey
 Kesik, Karataş, a village in Karataş district of Adana Province, Turkey
 Kızıltahta, Karataş, a village in Karataş district of Adana Province, Turkey
 Kiremitli, Karataş, a village in Karataş district of Adana Province, Turkey
 Köprügözü, Karataş, a village in Karataş district of Adana Province, Turkey
 Meletmez, Karataş, a village in Karataş district of Adana Province, Turkey
 Oymaklı, Karataş, a village in Karataş district of Adana Province, Turkey
 Sarımsaklı, Karataş, a village in Karataş district of Adana Province, Turkey
 Sirkenli, Karataş, a village in Karataş district of Adana Province, Turkey
 Tabaklar, Karataş, a village in Karataş district of Adana Province, Turkey
 Tabur, Karataş, a village in Karataş district of Adana Province, Turkey
 Terliksiz, Karataş, a village in Karataş district of Adana Province, Turkey
 Topraklı, Karataş, a village in Karataş district of Adana Province, Turkey
 Tuzkuyusu, Karataş, a village in Karataş district of Adana Province, Turkey
 Tuzla, Karataş, a village in Karataş district of Adana Province, Turkey
 Yanlızca, Karataş, a village in Karataş district of Adana Province, Turkey
 Yassıören, Karataş, a village in Karataş district of Adana Province, Turkey
 Yemişli, Karataş, a village in Karataş district of Adana Province, Turkey
 Yenice, Karataş, a village in Karataş district of Adana Province, Turkey
 Yenimurat, Karataş, a village in Karataş district of Adana Province, Turkey
 Yüzbaşı, Karataş, a village in Karataş district of Adana Province, Turkey
 Karataş, Sarayköy

See also
 Karata people, an indigenous people of the Caucasus